The Hankin Range is a small mountain range on Vancouver Island, British Columbia, Canada, located between Nimpkish and Bonanza Lakes. It has an area of 287 km2 and is a subrange of the Vancouver Island Ranges which in turn form part of the Insular Mountains.

See also
List of mountain ranges

References

External links

Vancouver Island Ranges
Mountain ranges of British Columbia